Georges Spanelly (1899–1979) was a French actor. In 1948 he starred in the film The Lame Devil under Sacha Guitry.

Filmography

External links

French male film actors
1899 births
1979 deaths
Place of birth missing
20th-century French male actors